Innate Immunity is a peer-reviewed scientific journal covering innate immunity in humans, animals, and plants. It is published by SAGE Publications on behalf of the International Endotoxin & Innate Immunity Society and the editor-in-chief is Otto Holst (Research Centre Borstel, Germany). The journal was established in 1994 as the Journal of Endotoxin Research and obtained its current title in 2006.

Abstracting and indexing 
The journal is abstracted and indexed in MEDLINE, Scopus, and the Science Citation Index Expanded. According to the Journal Citation Reports, the journal has a 2012 impact factor of 2.682.

References

External links 
 
 International Endotoxin & Innate Immunity Society

SAGE Publishing academic journals
English-language journals
Publications established in 1994
Immunology journals
Bimonthly journals